Rav Kahana, a name alluding to several Babylonian amoraim, may refer to:

Rav Kahana I
Rav Kahana II
 Rav Kahana III
 Rav Kahana IV